Staianus is a monotypic genus of Malagasy huntsman spiders containing the single species, Staianus acuminatus. It was first described by Eugène Louis Simon in 1889, and is found on Madagascar.

See also
 List of Sparassidae species

References

Monotypic Araneomorphae genera
Sparassidae
Spiders of Madagascar